is the oldest attested stage of the Japanese language, recorded in documents from the Nara period (8th century). It became Early Middle Japanese in the succeeding Heian period, but the precise delimitation of the stages is controversial.
Old Japanese was an early member of the Japonic language family. No genetic links to other language families have been proven.

Old Japanese was written using man'yōgana, using Chinese characters as syllabograms or (occasionally) logograms. It featured a few phonemic differences from later forms, such as a simpler syllable structure and distinctions between several pairs of syllables that have been pronounced identically since Early Middle Japanese. The phonetic realization of these distinctions is uncertain. Internal reconstruction points to a pre-Old Japanese phase with fewer consonants and vowels.

As is typical of Japonic languages, Old Japanese was primarily an agglutinative language with a subject–object–verb word order, adjectives and adverbs preceding the nouns and verbs they modified and auxiliary verbs and particles appended to the main verb. Unlike in later periods, Old Japanese adjectives could be used uninflected to modify following nouns.

Sources and dating

Old Japanese is usually defined as the language of the Nara period (710–794), when the capital was Heijō-kyō (now Nara).
That is the period of the earliest connected texts in Japanese, the 112 songs included in the Kojiki (712).
The other major literary sources of the period are the 128 songs included in the Nihon Shoki (720) and the Man'yōshū (c. 759), a compilation of over 4,500 poems.
Shorter samples are 25 poems in the Fudoki (720) and the 21 poems of the Bussokuseki-kahi (c. 752).
The latter has the virtue of being an original inscription, whereas the oldest surviving manuscripts of all the other texts are the results of centuries of copying, with the attendant risk of scribal errors.
Prose texts are more limited but are thought to reflect the syntax of Old Japanese more accurately than verse texts do. The most important are the 27  ('liturgies') recorded in the Engishiki (compiled in 927) and the 62  (literally 'Announced order', meaning imperial edicts) recorded in the Shoku Nihongi (797).

A limited number of Japanese words, mostly personal names and place names, are recorded phonetically in ancient Chinese texts, such as the "Wei Zhi" portion of the Records of the Three Kingdoms (3rd century AD), but the transcriptions by Chinese scholars are unreliable.
The oldest surviving native inscriptions, dating from the 5th or early 6th centuries, include those on the Suda Hachiman Shrine Mirror, the Inariyama Sword, and the Eta Funayama Sword.
Those inscriptions are written in Classical Chinese but contain several Japanese names that were transcribed phonetically using Chinese characters.
Such inscriptions became more common from the Suiko period (592–628).
Those fragments are usually considered a form of Old Japanese.

Of the 10,000 paper records kept at Shōsōin, only two, dating from about 762, are in Old Japanese.
Over 150,000 wooden tablets dating from the late 7th and early 8th century have been unearthed.
The tablets bear short texts, often in Old Japanese of a more colloquial style than the polished poems and liturgies of the primary corpus.

Writing system

Artifacts inscribed with Chinese characters dated as early as the 1st century AD have been found in Japan, but detailed knowledge of the script seems not to have reached the islands until the early 5th century.
According to the Kojiki and Nihon Shoki, the script was brought by scholars from Baekje (southwestern Korea).
The earliest texts found in Japan were written in Classical Chinese, probably by immigrant scribes.
Later "hybrid" texts show the influence of Japanese grammar, such as the word order (for example, the verb being placed after the object).

Chinese and Koreans had long used Chinese characters to write non-Chinese terms and proper names phonetically by selecting characters for Chinese words that sounded similar to each syllable.
Koreans also used the characters phonetically to write Korean particles and inflections that were added to Chinese texts to allow them to be read as Korean (Idu script).
In Japan, the practice was developed into , a complete script for the language that used Chinese characters phonetically, which was the ancestor of modern kana syllabaries.
This system was already in use in the verse parts of the Kojiki (712) and the Nihon Shoki (720).

For example, the first line of the first poem in the Kojiki was written with five characters:

This method of writing Japanese syllables by using characters for their Chinese sounds was supplemented with indirect methods in the complex mixed script of the Man'yōshū (c. 759).

Syllables
In , each Old Japanese syllable was represented by a Chinese character. Although any of several characters could be used for a given syllable, a careful analysis reveals that 88 syllables were distinguished in early Old Japanese, typified by the Kojiki songs:

As in later forms of Japanese, the system has gaps where yi and wu might be expected.
These are denoted by subscripts 1 and 2 respectively in the above table. The syllables mo1 and mo2 are not distinguished in the slightly-later Nihon Shoki and Man'yōshū, reducing the syllable count to 87.
Some authors also believe that two forms of po were distinguished in the Kojiki.
All of these pairs had merged in the Early Middle Japanese of the Heian period.

The consonants g, z, d, b and r did not occur at the start of a word.
Alexander Vovin argues that the non-initial syllables i and u in these cases should be read as Old Japanese syllables yi and wu.

The rare vowel i2 almost always occurred at the end of a morpheme.
Most occurrences of e1, e2 and o1 were also at the end of a morpheme.

Transcription 
Several different notations for the type A/B distinction are found in the literature, including:

Phonology
One difficulty is that the Middle Chinese pronunciations of the characters used are also disputed, and since the reconstruction of their phonetic values is partly based on later Sino-Japanese pronunciations, there is a danger of circular reasoning.
Additional evidence has been drawn from phonological typology, subsequent developments in the Japanese pronunciation, and the comparative study of the Ryukyuan languages.

Consonants
Miyake reconstructed the following consonant inventory:

The voiceless obstruents  had the voiced prenasalized counterparts .
The sibilants  and  may have been palatalized before e and i.

Comparative evidence from Ryukyuan languages suggests that Old Japanese p continued an earlier voiceless bilabial stop *p.
There is general agreement that word-initial p had become a voiceless bilabial fricative  by Early Middle Japanese, as suggested by its transcription as f in later Portuguese works and as ph or hw in the Korean textbook Ch'ŏphae Sinŏ. In Modern Standard Japanese, it is romanized as h and has different allophones before various vowels. In medial position, it became  in Early Middle Japanese but has disappeared except before a.

Vowels
The Chinese characters chosen to write syllables with the Old Japanese vowel a suggest that it was an open unrounded vowel .
The vowel u was a close back rounded vowel , unlike the unrounded  of Modern Standard Japanese.

The issue is hotly debated, and there is no consensus. The traditional view, first advanced by Kyōsuke Kindaichi in 1938, is that there were eight pure vowels, with the type B vowels being more central than their type A counterparts. The diphthong proposals are often connected to hypotheses about pre-Old Japanese, but all exhibit an uneven distribution of glides. 

The distinction between mo1 and mo2 was seen only in Kojiki and vanished afterwards.
The distribution of syllables suggests that there may have once been *po1, *po2, *bo1 and *bo2.
If that was true, a distinction was made between Co1 and Co2 for all consonants C except for w. Some take that as evidence that Co1 may have represented Cwo.

Accent
However, in one part of the Nihon Shoki, the Chinese characters appeared to have been chosen to represent a pitch pattern similar to that recorded in the Ruiju Myōgishō, a dictionary that was compiled in the late 11th century. In that section, a low pitch syllable was represented by a character with the Middle Chinese level tone, and a high pitch was represented by a character with one of the other three Middle Chinese tones.
(A similar division was used in the tone patterns of Chinese poetry, which were emulated by Japanese poets in the late Asuka period.)
Thus, it appears that the Old Japanese accent system was similar to that of Early Middle Japanese.

Phonotactics
Old Japanese words consisted of one or more open syllables of the form (C)V, subject to additional restrictions:
 Words did not begin with r or the voiced obstruents b, d, z, and g, with the exception of a few loanwords.
 A bare vowel did not occur except for word-initially: vowel sequences were not permitted.

In 1934, Arisaka Hideyo proposed a set of phonological restrictions permitted in a single morpheme. Arisaka's Law states that -o2 was generally not found in the same morpheme as -a, -o1 or -u.
Some scholars have interpreted that as a vestige of earlier vowel harmony, but it is very different from patterns that are observed in, for example, the Turkic languages.

Morphophonemics
Two adjacent vowels fused to form a new vowel when a consonant was lost within a morpheme, or a compound was lexicalized as a single morpheme.
The following fusions occurred:

i1 + a → e1
  'bloom' +  'exist' →  'be blooming'
  'wear' +  'be.' →  'wear.'
Further examples are provided by verbs ending with the retrospective auxiliary - and the verbal suffixes  'conjecture' or  'exist':
  +  →  '(it) has surely fallen'
  'exist..' +  →  'it existed'
i1 + o2 → e1
  'real' +  'person' →  'living person'
a + i → e2
  'long' +  'breath' →  'sigh'
  'high' +  'market' →  (place name)
o2 + i → e2
  'palace' +  'enter' →  'attendant'
o2 + i → i2
  'big' +  'rock' →  'big rock'
u + i → i2
  'young' +  'term of veneration (male)' →  (title)
u + a → o1
  'number' +  'to join' →  'to count'
u + o → o1
  'ancient type of native weaving' +  'weaving' →  'native weaving'

Adjacent vowels belonging to different morphemes, or pairs of vowels for which none of the above fusions applied, were reduced by deleting one or other of the vowels.
Most often, the first of the adjacent vowels was deleted:
  'eternal' +  'rock' →  'eternal rock; everlasting'
  'heaven' +  'descend' →  'descend from heaven'
The exception to this rule occurred when the first of the adjacent vowels was the sole vowel of a monosyllabic morpheme (usually a clitic), in which case the other vowel was deleted:
  (honorific) +  'horse' →  'honourable horse'
  'child, egg' +  'birth' →  'give birth, lay an egg'
Cases where both outcomes are found are attributed to different analyses of morpheme boundaries:
  'my' +  'house' →  'my house'
  'I' +   +  'house' →  'my house'

Pre-Old Japanese 
Internal reconstruction suggests that the stage preceding Old-Japanese had fewer consonants and vowels.

Consonants 
Internal reconstruction suggests that the Old Japanese voiced obstruents, which always occurred in medial position, arose from the weakening of earlier nasal syllables before voiceless obstruents:
 b  < *-mVp-, *-nVp-: e.g.  'net' +  'pull' →  'trawling'
 d  < *-mVt-, *-nVt-: e.g.  'mountain' +  'path' →  'mountain path'
 z  < *-mVs-, *-nVs-: e.g.  'village' +  'master' →  (title)
 g  < *-mVk-, *-nVk-
In some cases, there is no evidence for a preceding vowel, which leads some scholars to posit final nasals at the earlier stage.

Some linguists suggest that Old Japanese w and y derive, respectively, from *b and *d at some point before the oldest inscriptions in the 6th century.
Southern Ryukyuan varieties such as Miyako, Yaeyama and Yonaguni have  corresponding to Old Japanese w, but only Yonaguni (at the far end of the chain) has  where Old Japanese has y:
  'I' and  'stomach' corresponding to Old Japanese  and 
 Yonaguni  'house',  'hot water' and  'mountain' corresponding to Old Japanese ,  and 
However, many linguists, especially in Japan, argue that the Southern Ryukyuan voiced stops are local innovations, adducing a variety of reasons.

Some supporters of *b and *d also add *z and *g, which both disappeared in Old Japanese, for reasons of symmetry.
However, there is very little Japonic evidence for them.

Vowels 
Similarly, many nouns having independent forms ending in -i2 or -e2 also have bound forms ending in a different vowel, which are believed to be older.
For example,  'rice wine' has the form  in compounds such as  'sake cup'.
The following alternations are the most common:
 i2/u-: / 'god, spirit', / 'body', / 'a calm'. / 'moon', / 'stalk'.
 i2/o2-: / 'tree', / 'Hades',
 e2/a-: / 'eye', / 'heaven', / 'rain', / 'shade', / 'day, sun', / 'nail, hoof', / 'bamboo'.
The widely accepted analysis of this situation is that the most common Old Japanese vowels a, u, i1 and o2 reflect earlier *a, *u, *i and *ə respectively, and the other vowels reflect fusions of these vowels:
 i2 < *ui, *əi
 e1 < *ia, *iə
 e2 < *ai
 o1 < *ua, *uə
Thus the above independent forms of nouns can be derived from the bound form and a suffix *-i.
The origin of this suffix is debated, with one proposal being the ancestor of the obsolescent particle  (whose function is also uncertain), and another being a weakened consonant (suggested by proposed Korean cognates).

There are also alternations suggesting e2 < *əi, such as / 'back' and / 'bud'.
Some authors believe that they belong to an earlier layer than i2 < *əi, but others reconstruct two central vowels *ə and *ɨ, which merged everywhere except before *i.
Other authors attribute the variation to different reflexes in different dialects and note that *əi yields e in Ryukyuan languages.

Some instances of word-final e1 and o1 are difficult to analyse as fusions, and some authors postulate *e and *o to account for such cases.
A few alternations, as well as comparisons with Eastern Old Japanese and Ryukyuan languages, suggest that *e and *o also occurred in non-word-final positions at an earlier stage but were raised in such positions to i1 and u, respectively, in central Old Japanese.
The mid vowels are also found in some early  and in some modern Japanese dialects.

Grammar 
As in later forms of Japanese, Old Japanese word order was predominantly subject–object–verb, with adjectives and adverbs preceding the nouns and verbs they modify and auxiliary verbs and particles consistently appended to the main verb.

Nominals

Pronouns 
Many Old Japanese pronouns had both a short form and a longer form with attached  of uncertain etymology.
If the pronoun occurred in isolation, the longer form was used.
The short form was used with genitive particles or in nominal compounds, but in other situations either form was possible.

Personal pronouns were distinguished by taking the genitive marker , in contrast to the marker  used with demonstratives and nouns.
The  forms were also used reflexively, which suggests that  was originally an indefinite pronoun and gradually replaced .
 The third-person pronoun  was much less commonly used than the non-proximal demonstrative  from which it was derived.
 There were also an interrogative pronoun  and a reflexive pronoun .

Many forms had corresponding interrogative forms .

In Early Middle Japanese, the non-proximal  forms were reinterpreted as hearer-based (medial), and the speaker-based forms were divided into proximal  forms and distal / forms, yielding the three-way distinction that is still found in Modern Japanese.

Numerals 
In later texts, such as the Man'yōshū, numerals were sometimes written using Chinese logographs, which give no indication of pronunciation.
The following numerals are attested phonographically:

The forms for 50 and 70 and known only from Heian texts.

There is a single example of a phonographically recorded compound number, in Bussokuseki 2:

The only attested ordinal numeral is  'first'.
In Classical Japanese, the other ordinal numerals had the same form as cardinals, and this may also have been the case for Old Japanese, though there are no textual occurrences to settle the question.

Verbs 
Old Japanese had a richer system of verbal suffixes than later forms of Japanese.
Old Japanese verbs used inflection for modal and conjunctional purposes.
Other categories, such as voice, tense, aspect and mood, were expressed by using optional suffixed auxiliaries, which were also inflected.

Inflected forms 
As in later forms of Japanese, Old Japanese verbs had a large number of inflected forms.
In traditional Japanese grammar, they are represented by six forms from which all the others may be derived in a similar fashion to the principal parts used for Latin and other languages:
 (irrealis)
This form never occurs in isolation but only as a stem to which several particles and auxiliaries are attached. This stem originated from resegmentation of an initial  of several suffixes (auxiliary verbs) as part of the stem.
 (adverbial, infinitive)
This form was used as the infinitive. It also served as a stem for auxiliaries expressing tense and aspect.
 (conclusive, predicative)
This form was used as the main verb concluding a declarative sentence.  It was used also before modal extensions, final particles, and some conjunctional particles. The conclusive form merged with the attributive form by about 1600, but the distinction is preserved in the Ryukyuan languages and the Hachijōjima dialects.
 (attributive, adnominal)
This form was used as the verb in a nominalized clause or a clause modifying a noun. It was also used before most conjunctional particles.
 (realis, exclamatory, subjunctive)
This form was used as the main verb in an exclamatory sentence or as the verb in an adverbial clause.
 (imperative)
This form expressed the imperative mood.

This system has been criticized because the six forms are not equivalent, with one being solely a combinatory stem, three solely word forms, and two being both.
It also fails to capture some inflected forms.
However, five of the forms are basic inflected verb forms, and the system also describes almost all extended forms consistently.

Conjugation classes 

Old Japanese verbs are classified into eight conjugation classes, each being characterized by different patterns of inflected forms.
Three of the classes are grouped as consonant bases:
 (quadrigrade)
This class of regular consonant-base verbs includes approximately 75% of verbs.  The class is so named because the inflections in later forms of Japanese span four rows of a  table, corresponding to four vowels.  However, in Old Japanese, five different vowels were involved.  The bases are almost all of the form (C)VC-, with the final consonant being p, t, k, b, g, m, s or r.
 (n-irregular)
The three n-base verbs form a class of their own:  'die',  'depart' and the auxiliary  expressing completion of an action.  They are often described as a "hybrid" conjugation because the adnominal and exclamatory forms followed a similar pattern to vowel-base verbs.
 (r-irregular)
The irregular r-base verbs were  'be, exist' and other verbs that incorporated it, as well as  'sit', which became the existential verb  in later forms of Japanese.

The distinctions between i1 and i2 and between e1 and e2 were eliminated after s, z, t, d, n, y, r and w.

There were five vowel-base conjugation classes:
 (lower bigrade or e-bigrade)
The largest regular vowel-base class ended in e2 and included approximately 20% of verbs.
 (upper bigrade or i-bigrade)
This class of bases ended in i2 and included about 30 verbs.
 (upper monograde or i-monograde)
This class contains about 10 verbs of the form (C)i1-. Some monosyllabic i-bigrade verbs had already shifted to this class by Old Japanese, and the rest followed in Early Middle Japanese.
 (k-irregular)
This class consists of the single verb  'come'.
 (s-irregular)
This class consists of the single verb  'do'.

The bigrade verbs seem to belong to a later layer than the consonant-base verbs.
Many e-bigrade verbs are transitive or intransitive counterparts of consonant-base verbs.
In contrast, i-bigrade verbs tend to be intransitive.
Some bigrade bases also appear to reflect pre-Old-Japanese adjectives with vowel stems combined with an inchoative *-i suffix:
 *-a-i > -e2, e.g.  'redden, lighten' vs  'red'.
 *-u-i > -i2, e.g.  'get desolate, fade' vs  'lonely'.
 *-ə-i > -i2, e.g.  'get big, grow' vs  'big'.

Verbal auxiliaries 

Old Japanese had a rich system of auxiliary elements that could be suffixed to verb stems and were themselves inflected, usually following the regular consonant-stem or vowel-stem paradigms, but never including the full range of stems found with full verbs.

Tense and aspect were indicated by suffixes attached to the infinitive.
The tense suffixes were:
 the simple past  (conclusive),  (adnominal),  (exclamatory). The variation may indicate an origin in multiple forms.
 the modal past or retrospective , a fusion of the simple past with  'exist'.
 the past conjectural , a fusion of the simple past with the conjectural suffix .
All of these suffixes disappeared during the Late Middle Japanese period.

Other auxiliaries were attached to the irrealis stem:
 the negative  and  < *
 the passive  and 
 the causative 
 the honorific 
 the conjectural or tentative 
 the subjunctive

Adjectives
Old Japanese adjectives were originally nominals and, unlike in later periods, could be used uninflected to modify following nouns.
They could also be conjugated as stative verbs and were divided into two classes:

Adjectives of this class tended to express more subjective qualities.
Many of them were formed from a verbal stem by the addition of a suffix , of uncertain origin.

Towards the end of the Old Japanese period, a more expressive conjugation emerged by adding the verb  'be' to the infinitive, with the sequence  reducing to :

Dialects

Although most Old Japanese writing represents the language of the Nara court in central Japan, some sources come from eastern Japan:
 230  'eastern songs', making up volume 14 of the Man'yōshū,
 93 (101 according to some authors)  'borderguard songs' in volume 20 of the Man'yōshū, and
 9 songs in the Hitachi fudoki (recorded 714–718, but the oldest extant manuscripts date from the late 17th century and show significant corruption).
They record Eastern Old Japanese dialects, with several differences from central Old Japanese (also known as Western Old Japanese):
 There is no type A/B distinction on front vowels i and e, but o1 and o2 are distinguished.
 Pre-Old Japanese *ia yielded a in the east, where central Old Japanese has e1.
 The adnominal form of consonant-base verbs ended in -o1, but central Old Japanese ended in -u for both the adnominal and the conclusive forms. A similar difference is preserved in Ryukyuan languages, suggesting that central Old Japanese had innovated by merging those endings.
 The imperative form of vowel-base verbs attached , instead of the  used in central Old Japanese. This difference has persisted into modern eastern and western dialects.
 There was a group of distinctive negative auxiliaries, but they do not seem to be the source of the different negatives in the modern eastern and western Japanese dialects.
 A significant number of words borrowed from Ainu.

See also
 Classical Japanese language

Notes

References

Works cited

Further reading

External links 
 Oxford-NINJAL Corpus of Old Japanese – Old Japanese poems, in original script and transcription, with morphological and syntactic analysis, and a linked dictionary.

Languages attested from the 8th century
Agglutinative languages
Ancient Japan
Archaic Japanese language
Japonic languages

Subject–object–verb languages